There were 12 female and 26 male athletes representing the country at the 2000 Summer Paralympics.

Medallists

See also
2000 Summer Paralympics

References

Bibliography

External links
International Paralympic Committee

Nations at the 2000 Summer Paralympics
Paralympics
2000